Robert Fernier (26 July 1895 – 27 May 1977) was a French painter. His work was part of the painting event in the art competition at the 1932 Summer Olympics.

References

1895 births
1977 deaths
20th-century French painters
20th-century French male artists
French male painters
Olympic competitors in art competitions
People from Pontarlier
19th-century French male artists